Nikita Vasilevich  Melnikov (born 27 June 1987 in Shakhty, Russia) is an Ethnic Russian Greco-Roman wrestler.

He won both gold medals in the 2013 Summer Universiade in Kazan, Russia - his country and 2013 World Wrestling Championships in Budapest, Hungary.

In 2016 European Wrestling Championships he beat third consecutive to Artur Aleksanyan of Armenia and became European Champion in 98 kilos.

References 

 Profile

Russian male sport wrestlers
1987 births
Living people
World Wrestling Championships medalists
Universiade medalists in wrestling
Universiade gold medalists for Russia
European Wrestling Championships medalists
Medalists at the 2013 Summer Universiade
People from Shakhty
Sportspeople from Rostov Oblast